The Venezuelan Army, officially the National Army of the Bolivarian Republic of Venezuela, is the land arm of the National Bolivarian Armed Forces of Venezuela. Also known as Bolivarian Army (Ejército Bolivariano, EB), its role is to be responsible for land-based operations against external or internal threats that may put the sovereignty of the nation at risk. The army is the second largest military branch of Venezuela after the Bolivarian Militia (Milicia Bolivariana, MB).

Its current commander is Major General Domingo Antonio Hernández Lárez. The army depends directly on the Ministry of Popular Power for Defense, under the orders of the general commander and the president of the Republic in his position as commander in chief of the National Bolivarian Armed Forces. It is divided into six combat arms and four commands; operations, logistics, education and Army Aviation.

The command officers, troop officers, technicians and military surgeons belonging to the Venezuelan Army are graduates of the military academies of the Bolivarian Military University of Venezuela and are commissioned with the rank of Second Lieutenant, the academies are as follows:

 Military Academy of the Bolivarian Army,
 Military Academy of Troop Officers C-in-C Hugo Rafael Chávez Frías,
 Bolivarian Military Technical Academy,
 Military Academy of Health Sciences

Unlike most of the officer corps the sergeants (professional NCOs) and recruits completing basic training, as well as Army officer candidates of civilian background, study in separate schools.

The Venezuelan Army marks its birth by its victory in the Battle of Carabobo on 24 June 1821 over the Empire of Spain, which led to the independence of the nation. It later contributed to the independence of the present-day countries of Colombia, Ecuador, Panama, Peru, and Bolivia.

History

Independence 
With the beginning of the independence movement on 19 April 1810 and the subsequent war in the country, a military academy was created in 1810 by decree of the Supreme Board of Caracas for the training of officers for the Republican cause. The Royalist reaction was fast and by 1812 the First Republic was dissolved. A war to the death begun (guerra a muerte), with neither side giving quarter. On 11 April 1817, 1,800 Republicans under General Píer won a major victory against the Royalists at San Félix (southeast of Caracas), where the revolutionaries defeated 1,500 Royalists under General Nicolás María Cerruti. The Royalists suffered 593 dead and 497 captured, of whom 160 peninsulares (Spaniards born in the Iberian Peninsula). All of the Spaniards were decapitated. The Republicans lost 31 dead and 65 wounded.

The war continued until 1824 with successes and failures on each side. On 7 August 1819, the army of New Granada, under the command of the Liberator Simón Bolívar, defeats the Royalist troops under the command of General José María Barreiro in the Battle of Boyacá, being the first republic of the so-called Bolivarianas (Bolivarians) to obtain their independence of the Kingdom of Spain; a day that also celebrates the Colombian Army.

The liberating army, whose central nucleus are the infantry battalions of Rifles, Voltígeros, Vencedores, the British Legion, plus the contingents of the lancers Bravos de Apure of General José Antonio Páez, and whose contingents are made up mainly of Colombian-Venezuelan troops under the supreme leadership of Bolívar, are now waging the Venezuelan campaign as part of Gran Colombia. On 24 June 1821, the Republicans obtained a decisive victory over the Royalists in the battle at Campo de Carabobo, and today is celebrated as the day of the Venezuelan Army.

After the Battle of Carabobo, the remnants of the Royalist armies that managed to escape from the battlefield took refuge in Puerto Cabello, while in the east they did the same in Cumaná. Cumaná was taken shortly after by the Republicans, but the heavily fortified city of Puerto Cabello resisted under siege until 1823, during which time it served as the base for the Spanish reconquest of territories in western Venezuela.

Afterwards, these troops take part in the Southern Campaign under the command of Marshal Antonio José de Sucre, and went on to liberate Ecuador in the Battle of Pichincha, Peru in the Battle of Junín, and Alto Peru (today Bolivia) in the Battle of Ayacucho.

19th century 

After the army fought in the Gran Colombia–Peru War (1828-1829), and once Venezuela separated from Gran Colombia in 1830, the country went through periods of great instability and civil wars throughout the 19th century, which led to the end of the professional army and in its place emerged the figure of the regional leader (caudillo) who organized their montoneras (irregular militia) to fight in internal civil wars. 

This precarious situation ended when in 1899 Cipriano Castro took power as president and once again lays the foundations for a professional army, which his successor Juan Vicente Gómez deepens.

20th century 
The army followed a growing line of modernization and professionalization throughout the 20th century, under the Prussian model. After the death of Gómez and the instability that followed, the army took sides in the politics of the time, with a dominance of militaristic sectors in the country's politics in the period 1940-1958, with the army carrying out three coups d'état in 1945, 1948 and in 1958 ending the dictatorship of General Marcos Pérez Jiménez, within the framework of the Cold War.

With the overthrow of the Pérez Jiménes and the return to democracy, the most significant actions that involved the army were the combat of the Marxist-Leninist guerrillas of the Armed Forces of National Liberation (Fuerzas Armadas de Liberación Nacional, FALN), made up of activists from the Communist Party of Venezuela and the Revolutionary Left Movement (Movimiento de Izquierda Revolucionaria, MIR) that were heavily active throughout the 60's; as well as the deployment of Venezuelan troops in a UN peacekeeping mission in Nicaragua.

Other missions undertaken by the army where the repression of looting of private property during the "Caracazo" protests in February 1989 and the failed coups by future president Colonel Hugo Chávez in April and November 1992.

21st century 

In the 21st century, the Venezuelan Army has experienced unprecedented growth, incorporating war a big influx of material, mostly from Russia, in almost all segments of its arsenal, allowing an almost total modernization of the force. In the last three decades, it has had to face the spillover into Venezuela of the Colombian internal conflict; and sometimes being put on alert due to tensions between Caracas and Bogotá.

The National Bolivarian Armed Forces of Venezuela is the 4th largest military in Latin America, behind Brazil, Colombia and Mexico.

Mission and vision

Its mission, as the ground forces of the National Bolivarian Armed Forces of Venezuela, is to:

Secure the ground defenses of the nation,
Contribute to the establishment of democratic institutions and build up respect and full compliance to the laws of the Republic as mandated,
Support national development and integration,
And to participate in programs of international cooperation and peacekeeping.

Functions of the Army 
In accordance with the Article 9 of the National Armed Forces Organic Law as amended, the functions of the Army are to

 Organize, train and equip units for ground forces operations
 Establish doctrines for the various operations it has to undertake 
 Participate in military mobilization programs
 Maintain the national borders
 And actively achieve readiness to develop technologies and scientifical advances for the advancement of national defense

Official hymn

Spanish lyrics
Chorus

Adelante marchemos, valientes, al combate y al rudo fragor
por la patria muy altas las frentes, despleguemos pujanza y valor.
Por la patria muy altas las frentes, despleguemos pujanza y valor.

Nuestra sangre es la savia del pueblo y en el pueblo se plasma en canción
es la rosa más pura del viento que en la historia da brillo a la acción,
En las aguas, el aire y la tierra la victoria es el alba inmortal,
si sublime es el triunfo en la guerra, preservemos la gloria y la paz.

Chorus

Y si el brazo extranjero se atreve a infamar de este suelo el honor
antes muerte mil veces nos llegue que rendirnos al torpe invasor,
pues de todas las patrias que el cielo diera al hombre en morada de amor,
es la nuestra el más hondo desvelo en el sueño de un mundo mejor.

Chorus

Equipment

Organization 

The Venezuelan Army is divided into 4 main commands and 6 army divisions as well as other independent units reporting to Headquarters, Venezuelan Army. The Army's Air Defense Artillery Brigades also report directly, as part of the Venezuelan Air Force Air Defense Forces Command, to the Operational Strategic Command for national defense purposes in air defense matters.

Army major commands

Army General Command

Army Logistics Command

Army Aviation Command

Special Forces 
99th Army Special Operations Brigade

Army divisions and corps

1st Infantry Division

2nd Infantry Division

The 79th Andes Air Defense Artillery Brigade reports directly to the Operational Strategic Command, while being in the 2ID's territorial jurisdiction.

3rd Infantry Division

Since 2016 the newly created 34th CCB reports also to the Operational Strategic Command.

4th Armored Division

5th Jungle Infantry Division

9th Cavalry Division

6th Corps of Engineers

Ranks

Commanding Generals of the Army 

(*): Marks promotion to the rank of full General (and appointment as Minister of Defense) after serving term as Commanding General of the Army

References

External links

  Sitio oficial del Ministerio del Poder Popular para la Defensa de Venezuela
  Sitio oficial del Ejército Libertador (Venezuela)
  Sitio oficial de la Aviación del Ejército del Venezuela
 Latin American Light Weapons National Inventories

Military of Venezuela
Armies by country
Military units and formations established in 1810